The Republika Srpska Air Force was the air force of Republika Srpska and was used primarily during the Bosnian war. In 2005, it was integrated into the Armed Forces of Bosnia and Herzegovina.  SFOR (NATO Stabilization Force) still plays a large role in Bosnia and Herzegovina, which consists of the Federation of Bosnia and Herzegovina and Republika Srpska. Under the leadership of one president, the ministry of defense of both entities merged into one single ministry of defense with one chief of joint staff commanding both Air Forces. In 2004 there was again a restructuring of the armed forces, bringing the number of Air Force personnel down to 4,000. Next to the command, the 1st Regiment V i PVO consists out of a platoon, a radar battalion, artillery rocket ADF battalion, AF logistics battalion and aviation assets, a Fighter Bomber Squadron and Mixed Helicopter Squadron. In 2006 the Air Force of Republika Srpska was disbanded.

History

Creation
Following the declarations of independence by Slovenia, Croatia and Republic of Macedonia, the leadership of Bosnia-Herzegovina also declared independence at the end of 1991 after a referendum which was boycotted by most Bosnian Serbs. Feeling themselves Serbs because of their history, religion and traditions, Bosnian Serbs rejected the declaration, and established an alternative assembly, holding a referendum in November 1991 on remaining in the rump Yugoslav federation. After the declaration of independence by Bosnia and Herzegovina the Bosnian Serbs began to form autonomous enclaves and finally on 9 January 1992 the independent state of Republika Srpska was declared within Bosnia-Herzegovina. The Air Force and Air Defense (Ratno Vazduhoplovstvo i Protivvazdusna Odbrana Vojske Republike Srpske - RV i PVO VRS) was established, and took over operations from the Yugoslav Air Force and Air Defense (Jugoslovensko Ratno Vazduhoplovstvo i Protiv Vazdusna Odbrana or JRV i PVO). The barracks at Zalužani became home to the Command and subordinated units of the newly created Air Force and Air Defence of the Army of the Republika Srpska. The official ceremony that was intended to mark the creation of the Bosnian Serb Air Force and Air Defence Forces took place at Zaluzani air base on 27 May 1992.

The majority of the fixed-wing aircraft were originally part of the 82nd Aviation Brigade, consisting out 237th lbae (Fighter Bomber Squadron with the J-21 Jastreb), 238th lbae (named "Vrbas Lynxes" flying the J-22 Orao) and 351st iae (Reconnaissance Squadron with the IJ-21, J-22 and IJ-22), which were located at the Cerklje ob Krki Air Base in Slovenia. 

On the night of 27 to 28 June 1991, following an attack by Slovenian forces, 67 aircraft were flown out of Cerklje to Zadar-Zemunik air base in Croatia. Among others, the Yugoslav People's Army completely withdrew the 474th vazduhoplovna baza (Air Base) from Slovenia, a unit that was responsible for Cerklje ob Krki Air Base. During the withdrawal every movable object, including the runway lighting and ILS systems, were dismantled and removed. On 12 August 1991, the 474th Air Base was re-established in Banja Luka and became responsible both for Mahovljani and Zaluzani airfields.

Finally, on 11 August 1991, the majority of the aircraft from the 82nd Aviation Brigade were once again relocated, but this time to their final destination, the Mahovljani airfield near Banja Luka. At Mahovljani, the 474th Air Base was renumbered to 74th Air Base, and the former Yugoslav Air Force 237th Fighter-bomber Aviation Squadron and 238th Fighter-bomber Aviation Squadron, were re-established as the Republika Srpska Air Force 27th Fighter-bomber Aviation Squadron and 28th Fighter-bomber Aviation Squadron, respectively, each reporting directly to the command of the air force and air defense.

The helicopter fleet used to be part of the 111th Aviation Brigade at Zagreb-Pleso (Croatia) composed of four squadrons: 679th Transport Aviation Squadron equipped with An-2 and An-26 transport aircraft, 711th Anti-armour Helicopter Squadron, equipped with Gazelle GAMA anti-tank helicopters, 713th Anti-armour Helicopter Squadron, equipped with Gazelle GAMA anti-tank helicopters and 780th Transport Helicopter Squadron, equipped with Mi-8T transport helicopters. Elements of all three helicopter squadrons along with Gazelle-HERA liaison helicopters inherited from the helicopter flight of former 896th Helicopter Reconnaissance and Liaison Squadron under command of headquarters of the 2nd Sarajevo Military Districts of the former Yugoslav People's Army were used as a base for creation of the Republika Srpska Air Force 111th Helicopter Regiment, based at former tank-barracks of Zaluzani, consisted of two squadrons: 711th Anti-armour Helicopter Squadron, equipped with Gazelle-GAMA and Gazelle-HERA helicopters, and 780th Transport Helicopter Squadron equipped with Mi-8T transport helicopters.

Additional reinforcement to the Republika Srpska Air Force was ensured with the introduction of the 92nd Light Multi-role Aircraft Squadron, which was in fact a mixed collection of light aircraft which were confiscated from sport aeroclubs around Bosnia. It has been confirmed that the 92nd Light Multi role Aircraft Squadron was equipped with An-2, UTVA-66, UTVA-75, Zlin 526F, PZL-104 Wilga 80, Piper PA-18-150 Super Cub and Cessna 172 aircraft that were divided into three flights, based at Zaluzani, Prijedor and Bratunac airfields.

The air defense units which have become part of Republika Srpska Air Force and Air Defense were 155th Air Defense Missile Brigade, which was relocated from area of Zagreb and Cerklje to Banja Luka in 1991, equipped with S-75M Volhov and SA-75Mk Dvina missiles, 84th Air Defense Light Rocket-Artillery Regiment, 172nd Air Defense Self-Propelled Missile Regiment equipped with 2K12 Kub SAM's and 51st Air Reconnaissance Battalion.

On 26 July 1992, just two months after the initial structure of the Bosnian Serb Air Force was established, the flying units were once again reorganized. The 111th Helicopter Regiment was disbanded, and a new unit designated 92nd Mixed Aviation Brigade was formed to control both fixed-wing and helicopter squadrons. Later, during the same year, the 711th Anti-armour Helicopter Squadron and the 780th Transport Helicopter Squadrons were merged to create the new unit designated 89th Mixed Helicopter Squadron.

During the war in Bosnia and Herzegovina, Bosnian Serb Air Force had conducted 17,316 sorties of all kinds, a large proportion of these being combat flights under the nose of NATO's Operation Deny Flight. However, it is important to note that 18 percent of all the sorties conducted between 27 May 1992 and December 1995 were medical evacuation flights, a total of 3.179 sorties. Over the war years, the Republika Srpska Air Force has lost 18 aircraft: five J-22 Oraos, six J- 21Jastrebs, five Gazelles and two Mi-8s as a result of enemy fire or accidents.

After the war

In March 1996 the entire Republika Srpska Army was reorganized and the Bosnian Serb air arm was renamed Aviation and air defense of the Army of the Republika Srpska (Vazduhoplovstvo i Protivvazdusna Odbrana Vojske Republike Srpske or V i PVO VRS). Additionally, all the units of the Bosnian Serb Air Force were once again reorganized and renumbered: the 74th Air Base was renumbered to 874th Air Base, the 92nd Mixed Aviation Brigade became 892nd Mixed Aviation Brigade and the 89th Mixed Helicopter Squadron became simply known as the 2nd Mixed Helicopter Squadron. The 27th and 28th Fighter-bomber Aviation Squadrons were merged to create the new unit that became known as 1st Fighter-Bomber Aviation Squadron. The 92nd Light Multi role Aircraft Squadron was disbanded and its aircraft were returned to their respective owners: the sport air clubs at Banja Luka, Bratunac and Prijedor. However, the V i PVO VRS retained two UTVA-75 aircraft in order to secure regular training flights to its Air Force pilots.

According to the Florence Agreement on Sub-Regional Arms Control (Article IV), signed in June 1996, the Republika Srpska was allowed to possess 21 combat aircraft and seven attack helicopters. In order to comply with the Florence Agreement, the Republika Srpska Air Force disarmed and withdraw from service four J-21 Jastreb ground attack aircraft and also disarmed six Aérospatiale Gazelle helicopters.

Due to the reorganisation of both armed forces in Bosnia and Herzegovina, since June 1, 2004 the Republika Srpska Air Force is officially called 1st Regiment Air Force and Air Defence of Army of Republika Srpska (Serbo-Croatian: 1. Puk  Vazduhoplovstva i Protiv Vazdušne Odbrana Vojske Republike Srpske / 1. Пук Ваздухопловства и Противваздушне Одбране Војске Републике Српске). The entire branch has been downgraded to a regiment that consistent from two squadrons (fighter-bomber and mixed helicopter), and rocket-artillery air defense, air reconnaissance and logistics battalions.

Disband
As both the Army of Republika Srpska and the Army of the Federation of Bosnia and Herzegovina have been disbanded and united into the Armed Forces of Bosnia and Herzegovina (OSBiH), the V i PVO VRS has ceased to exist. The personnel and some equipment have continued their service in new OSBiH. Jet aircraft are put in storage because of the lack of spare parts and the high costs to operate them. Because of that, some jet pilots have been retrained to be helicopter pilots, but left the service. Mixed Helicopter Squadron has become Helicopter Battalion, equipped with six overhauled Gazelle utility helicopters, while two Mi-8T's will soon return from the overhaul. A radar battalion has become Air Reconnaissance Battalion, AF logistics battalion has become Air Support Battalion, and both units remain in the Banja Luka, while artillery rocket ADF battalion has become Air Defense Battalion relocated to Sarajevo. Before disbanding of  V i PVO VRS, seven Gazelle helicopters were donated from the Air Force to the Ministry of Interior and the Department of Civil Aviation. The 17 fixed-wing aircraft will be offered for sale, and currently, Serbian Air Force is only one interested to buy seven J-22 Orao ground attack aircraft and a single G-4 Super Galeb advanced training and light attack aircraft.

Notes

Military units and formations established in 1992
Military units and formations disestablished in 2006
Military of Republika Srpska
Disbanded air forces
Serbian nationalism in Bosnia and Herzegovina